Scoparia panopla is a species of moth in the family Crambidae. It is endemic to New Zealand.

Taxonomy
This species was named by Edward Meyrick in 1884. Meyrick gave a description of the species in 1885. However the placement of this species within the genus Scoparia is in doubt. As a result, this species has also been referred to as Scoparia (s.l.) panopla.

Description

The wingspan is about 31 mm for males and 25 mm for females. The forewings are brownish-ochreous, irrorated with white on a streak along the costa. There is a sinuate streak from the middle of the disc to the hindmargin, as well as a narrow black streak from the base along the submedian fold to the middle. The veins between the apex and anal angle are posteriorly marked with blackish streaks, as well as a hindmarginal row of blackish dots. The hindwings are grey-whitish, with a narrow, somewhat darker hindmarginal band. Adults have been recorded on wing in January.

References

Moths described in 1884
Scorparia
Moths of New Zealand
Endemic fauna of New Zealand
Taxa named by Edward Meyrick
Endemic moths of New Zealand